The 2008 Masters (officially the 2008 SAGA Insurance Masters) was a professional non-ranking snooker tournament that took place between 13 and 20 January 2008 at the Wembley Arena in London, England.

Mark Selby won the tournament on his first attempt by defeating Stephen Lee 10–3 in the final. In the final frame, he tied Ken Doherty for the highest break of the tournament, recording a total clearance of 141.

This was the first time since 2003 that Ronnie O'Sullivan had failed to reach the final; the defending champion lost 5–6 to Stephen Maguire in the first round.

Facts and figures
 Ryan Day potted 15 reds and 14 blacks in his wild-card match against Barry Hawkins before attempting a long black in an attempt to achieve a 147, instead of potting a straightforward brown and getting an almost assured 144.
 Peter Ebdon also was on for a 147, but missed the last-but-one red in his quarter-final match against Stephen Lee.
 Ding Junhui won his match against John Higgins 6–4, needing a snooker in the last frame with the last 5 colours remaining.
 Mark Williams scored his first century of the season (a 118) in winning the first two frames against Ken Doherty, before losing the next six.
 Ken Doherty was 4–1 down to Shaun Murphy, but made three centuries in four frames in winning 6–5.
 Seven matches went to a deciding frame (6–5).
 Two first-round matches went to the last black: Stephen Lee's match against Graeme Dott, where he came from 5–2 down to win 5–6; and Marco Fu also won on the black in defeating Neil Robertson.
 Mark Selby won three deciding-frame matches in reaching the final, coming from 5–3 to beat both Stephen Hendry and Stephen Maguire 6–5, and he also beat Ken Doherty by the same scoreline in his semi-final.
 Michaela Tabb became the first woman to referee a Masters final. She had already refereed the Welsh Open final in 2007.

Field
Defending champion Ronnie O'Sullivan was the number 1 seed with World Champion John Higgins seeded 2. Places were allocated to the top 16 players in the world rankings. Players seeded 15 and 16 played in the wild-card round against the winner of the qualifying event, Barry Hawkins (ranked 19), and wild-card selection Marco Fu (ranked 27). Mark Selby was making his debut in the Masters.

Prize fund
The breakdown of prize money for this year is shown below:

Qualifying stage
Winner: £2,000
Runner Up: £680
Semi-final: £250
Quarter-final: £105
Total: £3,600

Televised stage

Winner: £150,000
Runner-up: £68,000
Semi-final: £34,000
Quarter-finalist: £16,000
Last 16: £12,000
Last 18 (wild-cards): £2,000

Highest break: £10,000
Maximum break: £25,000
Total: £460,000

Wild-card round
In the wild-card round, the qualifier and wild-card players played the 15th and 16th seeds:

Main draw

Final

Qualifying
The 2007 Masters Qualifying Event was held between 7 September and 12 September 2007 at the English Institute of Sport in Sheffield. The winner of this series of matches, who qualified for the tournament, was Barry Hawkins.

Century breaks

Main stage centuries
Total: 23

 141, 132, 125, 124, 107, 103  Mark Selby
 141, 123, 114, 101  Ken Doherty
 135  Ding Junhui
 120, 113  Ryan Day
 118  Neil Robertson
 118  Mark Williams

 112  Ronnie O'Sullivan
 107  Graeme Dott
 105, 103  Stephen Maguire
 105  Peter Ebdon
 105  Stephen Hendry
 104, 100  Marco Fu

Qualifying stage centuries
Total: 27

 140  Jamie Burnett
 137, 104  Liu Chuang
 136  Anthony Hamilton
 135, 123, 109, 107, 103  Jamie Cope
 125  Joe Perry
 122, 110  Kurt Maflin
 119, 113  Judd Trump
 114, 105  Andrew Higginson
 114  Jimmy White

 110, 102  Mark Allen
 110  Xiao Guodong
 107, 104  Ricky Walden
 107  Joe Delaney
 103  David Gilbert
 101  Andrew Norman
 100  Alfie Burden
 100  Nigel Bond

References

2008
Masters
Masters (snooker)
Masters (snooker)
Masters (snooker)